Ahmed Eisa Kamil (Arabic:أحمد عيسى كميل; born 19 September 1983 ) is an Emirati footballer.

External links

References

Emirati footballers
1983 births
Living people
Al-Ittihad Kalba SC players
Al-Shaab CSC players
Dibba FC players
Khor Fakkan Sports Club players
Place of birth missing (living people)
UAE First Division League players
UAE Pro League players
Association football defenders